Albert De Deken (7 September 1915 – 24 March 2003) was a Belgian footballer. He played in one match for the Belgium national football team in 1936.

References

External links
 

1915 births
2003 deaths
Belgian footballers
Belgium international footballers
Place of birth missing
Association football forwards